A Head Full of Dreams  is the seventh studio album by British rock band Coldplay, released on 4 December 2015, by Parlophone in the United Kingdom, and by Atlantic Records in the United States. Coldplay recorded the album from early to mid 2015, right after the completion of their previous album Ghost Stories, with a markedly different style and sound from its predecessors. For various songs, Coldplay collaborated with Beyoncé, Noel Gallagher, Tove Lo, Khatia Buniatishvili and Merry Clayton. The album was produced by Rik Simpson and Stargate. The album also features a sample of President Barack Obama singing "Amazing Grace" at Clementa C. Pinckney's funeral on the song "Kaleidoscope".

The album received generally mixed reviews from critics. Nevertheless, it was a commercial success as it topped the UK Albums Chart, and peaked at number two in the United States, Australia, Canada, and Italy, where it was held off the top spot by Adele's 25. At the 2016 Brit Awards the album was nominated for British Album of the Year. It was the eighth-best-selling album of 2015 with 1.9 million copies sold worldwide, according to the International Federation of the Phonographic Industry. It was the ninth-best-selling album of 2016, with 1.4 million copies sold worldwide, according to the International Federation of the Phonographic Industry. As of November 2017, the album has sold over 4,5 million copies worldwide. It was supported by five singles: "Adventure of a Lifetime", "Hymn for the Weekend", "Up&Up", the title track, and "Everglow". A 5.1 Surround Blu-ray Audio version of the album was released via the band's website on 23 September 2016.

The album was promoted by the successful A Head Full of Dreams Tour, that lasted nearly two years. The following year after the tour's conclusion, the band released Live in Buenos Aires, which was recorded on the final two nights of the tour in La Plata, Buenos Aires. A concert film and a documentary were also included in a deluxe edition of the CD. A second live album entitled Love In Tokyo was also released as a Japanese exclusive album which featured recordings from multiple legs of the tour.

Background
Coldplay began working on A Head Full of Dreams in late 2014 after promoting their sixth album Ghost Stories. The album has a markedly different style and sound from its predecessors. In an interview with Radio 2 DJ Jo Whiley in December 2014, guitarist Jonny Buckland and bass guitarist Guy Berryman gave a hint as to the difference between A Head Full of Dreams and its predecessor – Buckland called it the "night to the day", comparing the style of Ghost Stories to the expected uplifting theme of A Head Full of Dreams. Lead singer Chris Martin hinted at the style of the album by saying that the band was trying to make something colourful and uplifting. He also stated that it would be something to "shuffle your feet" to.

On 26 September 2015, the band performed at the Global Citizen Festival 2015 in New York City, playing a six-song set, including a new song called "Amazing Day". The band's producer Rik Simpson confirmed that the song would be on the new album. On 21 November 2016 frontman Chris Martin announced new material to be released for 2017 via Twitter, it would be named Kaleidoscope EP. The album was produced by Rik Simpson (the band's longterm collaborator) and Norwegian duo Stargate (Tor Hermansen and Mikkel Eriksen). Mixing duties were carried out predominately by Rik Simpson. Stargate executive produced the album.

Promotion

Tour

Compared to the sparse tour dates of the Ghost Stories era, Coldplay announced a larger global tour soon after the album release, which will be more reminiscent of the Mylo Xyloto Tour than the Ghost Stories Tour, to promote both A Head Full of Dreams and Ghost Stories. It was confirmed that the band will perform in locations such as India and South America – more specifically Argentina, Peru, Brazil, Chile, Colombia and Mexico in the first half of 2016. They have since confirmed that pre-production on the tour has started and that the official tour is planned to start next year. On 20 November 2015, they announced the A Head Full of Dreams Tour, with shows in South America starting at 31 March 2016, Buenos Aires and a European leg is also announced for summer 2016, including four sold-out nights at Wembley Stadium in June. In February, the band featured a picture on various social media sites of a hot air balloon (a symbol used to promote the tour) by Glastonbury farms' main pyramid stage field, along with the date Sunday 26 June. Glastonbury organisers have since confirmed a record-breaking fourth headline appearance, having previously performed on the stage in 2000, 2002, 2005 and 2011. The band's appearance was then confirmed to be Coldplay's festival show of this year's tour. On 30 September 2016, after the huge success of 2016's A Head Full of Dreams Tour, Coldplay announced a new leg of the tour with dates in Germany, France, Austria, Poland, Belgium, Sweden, Italy, Ireland and Wales. On 7 October 2016, the band announced eighteen more shows in North America beginning in Aug 2017 and finishing in October. On 15 November 2016, they announced shows in Asia for April 2017, visiting Singapore, Philippines, Thailand, Taiwan, South Korea, and Japan.

Poster and artwork
Around 30 October 2015 anonymous posters were pinned up on the London Underground showing a geometric pattern, known as the Flower of Life, along with a note "December 4".
Coldplay fans claimed that the symbol resembled the design on a T-shirt worn by Coldplay frontman Chris Martin at the Global Citizen Festival in New York. On 2 November, Coldplay posted the same piece of artwork as an animated GIF on their Twitter account, seemingly confirming that it would be the album cover and 4 December was the album's release date. One day later, they published another animated image of which the former was a detailed view. The artwork was created by Argentine artist Pilar Zeta in collaboration with the band.
Oli Sykes, lead singer of British post-hardcore band Bring Me the Horizon, suggested that the flower of life symbol Coldplay used was similar to that of the design of Bring Me the Horizon's 2013 album Sempiternal. Sykes took to Twitter accusing Coldplay of "jackin our steez". He did however clarify in a NME interview that the "flower of life" is a universal symbol and has meanings across the world, none of which he owns the rights to. He also specifies that it had meaning to him and that he is simply acknowledging the symbol being spread and is happy for its doing so.

Live performances
At the Global Citizen Festival in New York Coldplay performed six songs, ending with the live debut of a new song, Amazing Day. They also played Amazing Day at TFI Friday, where they played four songs including the live debut of "Adventure of a Lifetime". During their concert at the Belasco Theater in Los Angeles they performed four songs from the new album, including the live debut of the songs A Head Full of Dreams and Up&Up. On 24 November Coldplay started releasing 10-15 second snippets of each song from the new album via Instagram at hourly intervals. On 7 February 2016, the band headlined the Super Bowl 50 halftime show.

Singles
"Adventure of a Lifetime", was released on 6 November 2015 as the album's lead single, the music video came out on 29 November 2015. "Everglow" then premiered on Zane Lowe's Beats 1 radio show on 26 November 2015 and released as a promotional single on the following day. "Hymn for the Weekend" was released as the second single for the album on 25 January 2016. The band received criticism from certain media outlets for the portrayal of Indian society in its music video. The third single, "Up&Up", was released on 22 April 2016, while "A Head Full of Dreams" arrived on 19 August 2016 with an accompanying music video. A stripped-down version of "Everglow", which was inspired by Martin's unrehearsed solo performance of the song due to a technical mishap at Glastonbury Festival, was released as the fifth and final single on 11 November 2016.

Critical reception

A Head Full of Dreams received generally mixed reviews from critics. At Metacritic, which assigns a normalized rating from mainstream critics' reviews, the album has a score of 60 out of 100 based on 27 reviews, indicating "mixed or average reviews". Jon Dolan of Rolling Stone wrote that A Head Full of Dreams "might be Coldplay's brightest album ever" and concluded: "He's [Chris Martin] hinted that this could be Coldplay's last album; if so, they're going out on a sustained note of grace." Barry Nicolson of NME called it "the most satisfying collection of songs they've written in years".

Alexis Petridis of The Guardian felt that A Head Full of Dreams "is frustratingly blighted by the sense that Coldplay haven't fully committed to the album's big idea" and remarked: "It's a moot point whether that's a sign of innate conservatism or of a band that know exactly what they are doing, who understand that you won't keep packing out those Midwestern sports stadiums if you frighten the horses." Citing the band's unwillingness to stray from their tried and true formula, Ian Gormely of Exclaim! wrote that "A Head Full of Dreams might have been a poptimist masterpiece. Instead, it's just another Coldplay album, with all the baggage — both positive and negative — that entails."

Stephen Thomas Erlewine of AllMusic gave the album 3.5/5 stars and acknowledged that "[the] message [that there's a big, bright, beautiful world just waiting to be discovered if you just open your heart and live a little] is unabashedly corny", but ultimately concluded that "under the stewardship of Chris Martin, Coldplay cheerfully embrace the cheese, ratcheting up both the sparkle and the sentiment so the album feels genuine in its embrace of eternal middle-aged clichés."

In a 1/5 star review in Truck & Driver's regular music reviews Shaun Connors queried "why such boring wishy-washy material has been successful," commenting the reasoning for this defeats all rational explanation. He continued: "With this latest collection of tedium there are contributions from Beyoncé (a so-so vocalist) and Noel Gallagher (a not even so-so guitarist)," to conclude with: "On the basis of this album, they've either run out of ideas or bored themselves senseless (or both)..." Under the Radar's Scott Dransfield panned the album as "insufferably bland at best and downright offensive at worst" and awarded it 2/10 stars.

Year-end lists

Accolades

Commercial performance
A Head Full of Dreams debuted at number three on the Irish Albums Chart on 11 December 2015, the band's lowest charting album in Ireland and their first to miss the top spot since Parachutes in 2000. The same day, the album debuted at number two on the UK Albums Chart on sales of 235,975, behind Adele's 25, which denied Coldplay a seventh consecutive number-one album. It was, however, their highest first-week album sales since 2008's Viva la Vida or Death and All His Friends, which sold 302,074 copies in its first week. Had A Head Full of Dreams debuted atop the UK Albums Chart, it would have made Coldplay only the second band in the UK chart history (after Oasis) to do so with their first seven albums. The album did, however, manage to top both the UK Album Downloads Chart and the Official Vinyl Albums Chart.

The album also reached number two in Australia, Canada, the Netherlands, and Italy, held off number one by Adele's 25 in all territories. In the Netherlands, however, the album eventually managed to reach the number one position in its 30th week on the charts, the week following Coldplay's two concerts in Amsterdam. Following their tour stint in Ireland, the album reached a new peak at number two in its 84th charting week.

In the United States, A Head Full of Dreams debuted at number two on the Billboard 200, with 210,000 equivalent album units, behind Adele's 25. It was the second-best-selling album of the week, selling 195,000 copies in its first week, which is a drop from the 383,000 copies sold in the first week by Ghost Stories. In its second week, the album fell to number seven on the Billboard 200, selling 61,000 copies. On the chart dated 27 February 2016, the album returned to the top 10 of the US Billboard 200, peaking at number four, selling 90,000 units (71,000 in pure album sales). On 4 March 2016, the album was certified Gold by the Recording Industry Association of America (RIAA) for combined album sales, streaming-equivalent and track-equivalent of half-million units. Later, it has been certified Platinum by the RIAA as Ghost Stories was, despite its lower first week sales. Additionally, it outsold Ghost Stories in the UK, with sales reaching one million mark. The only country where A Head Full of Dreams managed to debut at number one was Norway, replacing 25. This enabled Coldplay to achieve there what Adele prevented them from doing in other territories; all of their studio albums reaching the top spot.

On 12 February 2016, following the positive reception and exposure from Coldplay's headlining set at the Super Bowl 50 halftime show, the album rose to number one in the UK after selling 30,146 copies that week. This secured them a seventh number one album in the UK, thus putting them second in the list of acts with the most UK number one albums in the 21st century; only Robbie Williams has more, with 10. The album sold over 4,5 million copies worldwide as of November 2017.

Singles "Adventure of a Lifetime" and "Hymn for the Weekend" charting respectively at number 95 and number 75 on the Billboard Hot 100 Year-End chart for 2016, making A Head Full of Dreams their first album to have more than one single charting on a Billboard Hot 100 Year-End chart.

Track listing
Coldplay's songwriting members are Guy Berryman, Jonny Buckland, Will Champion and Chris Martin. Stargate are Tor Erik Hermansen and Mikkel S. Eriksen.

Notes
 Digital Divide are a production trio consisting of Venor Yard, Marcos Tovar and Scott Zant.
"Kaleidoscope" contains elements of "Amazing Grace" (written by John Newton and performed by Barack Obama).
"Army of One" (0:00–3:23) shares the track with hidden song "X Marks the Spot" (3:23–6:16).
"Colour Spectrum" is stylised as "".
Both "Kaleidoscope" and "Colour Spectrum" contain elements of the poem "The Guesthouse" written by Jallaludin "Molana" Rumi and read by Coleman Barks.
A 'Tour Edition' was released in Japan and Oceania during the accompanying tour which featured a second disc with remixes and unreleased live recordings originally intended for Ghost Stories Live 2014. The location of the recording varied according to the release region.

Personnel
Credits are adapted from A Head Full of Dreams liner notes.

Performing members
 Chris Martin – lead vocals, keyboards, acoustic guitar (tracks 2, 6, and 11)
 Jonny Buckland – electric guitar, keyboards, backing vocals (tracks 3, and 11)
 Guy Berryman – bass guitar, keyboards
 Will Champion – drums, drum pad, percussion, backing vocals

Additional musicians
 Davide Rossi – strings 
 Tim Bergling – additional programming 
Regiment Horns – brass 
 Beyoncé – vocals 
 Gwyneth Paltrow – vocals 
 Merry Clayton – vocals 
 Tove Lo – vocals 
 Khatia Buniatishvili – piano 
 Coleman Barks – narration 
 Barack Obama – spoken word 
 Annabelle Wallis – vocals 
 Noel Gallagher – guitar 
 Moses Martin – tambourine 
 Rik Simpson – vocals, additional instruments
 Mikkel S Eriksen – additional instruments
 Tor Erik Hermansen – additional instruments

Design and managerial
 Pilar Zeta, Coldplay – design, art direction
 Phil Harvey – photography
 Ultramajic – photography
 Dave Holmes – management
 Mandi Bursteen – co-management
 Arlene Moon – co-management

Choir
 Nico Berryman
 Jonah Buckland
 Violet Buckland
 Blue Ivy Carter
 Ava Champion
 Juno Champion
 Marianna Champion
 Rex Champion
 Aubrey Costall
 Harvey Costall
 James Duncan
 Brian Eno
 Elise Eriksen
 Hege Fossum Eriksen
 Selma Eriksen
 Jacob Green
 Sophia Green
 Daniel Grollo
 Finn Grollo
 Kat Grollo
 Mathilda Grollo
 Max Harvey
 Rofi Harvey
 Idil Hermansen
 Isak Hermansen
 Apple Martin 
 Moses Martin

Production
 Stargate – production
 Rik Simpson – production, mixing 
 Phil Tan – mixing 
 Dan Green – production, mixing , additional engineering
 Digital Divide – additional production 
 Emily Lazar – mastering
 Merlin Watts – mastering
 Bill Rahko – engineering
 Miles Walker – engineering
 Daniela Rivera – engineering
 Tom Bailey – additional engineering
 Robin Baynton – additional engineering
 Jaime Sickora – additional engineering
 Aleks von Korff – additional engineering
 Laurence Anslow – additional studio assistance
 Fiona Cruickshank – additional studio assistance
 Nicolas Essig – additional studio assistance
 Olga Fitzroy – additional studio assistance
 Jeff Gartenbaum – additional studio assistance
 Christian Green – additional studio assistance
 Pablo Hernandez – additional studio assistance
 Phil Joly – additional studio assistance
 Miguel Lara – additional studio assistance
 Matt McGinn – additional studio assistance
 Chris Owens – additional studio assistance
 Roxy Pope – additional studio assistance
 John Prestage – additional studio assistance
 Kyle Stevens – additional studio assistance
 Derrick Stockwell – additional studio assistance
 Matt Tuggle – additional studio assistance
 Ryan Walsh – additional studio assistance
 Joachim Berose – additional studio assistance
 Will Wetzel – additional studio assistance

Charts

Weekly charts

Monthly charts

Year-end charts

Decade-end charts

All-time charts

Certifications and sales

Release history

Notes

References

External links 

2015 albums
Albums produced by Rik Simpson
Albums produced by Stargate
Atlantic Records albums
Coldplay albums
Parlophone albums
Juno Award for International Album of the Year albums
Albums recorded at Henson Recording Studios